Simone Eriksrud (born 21 August 1970) is a Norwegian musician, singer and composer from Volda, and a member of D'Sound. She was earlier in her career known as Simone Larsen or just with the mononym Simone.

Career

In D'Sound

As Simone Larsen, she is best known as the lead singer and guitarist of the Norwegian band D'Sound often stylized as d'sound. The band was established by drummer Kim Ofstad and bassist Jonny Sjo in 1993 with Larsen on lead vocals. To date, the band has released seven studio albums, namely Spice of Life (1996), Beauty Is a Blessing (1998), Talkin' Talk (2001), Doublehearted (2003), My Today (2005), Starts and Ends (2009) and Signs (2014) in addition to the live album D'Sound – Live at Rockefeller Music Hall 2001 and a compilation album Smooth Escapes – The Very Best of D'Sound in 2004. In June 2018, she announced her departure to spend more time with the rest of her family. The band became a duo. She returned in 2022 as a touring member and collaborated with the duo for the song titled "Flashback", the third single from the album 25 (2022) which commemorates their 25th anniversary since the band's debut in 1997.

Solo career
Besides her career in D'Sound, Simone, which is her artist name, has also opted for a solo career and released her debut solo album The Last Days and Nights in 2004. Neither this album or the single "The Last Days and Nights of Rock 'n' Roll" achieved any great interest or a significant sales. In the same year she was invited to be a part of the 3rd season of the reality show Hver gang vi møtes, which was broadcast on the Norwegian TV channel TV 2, where both D'Sound and her own songs were performed by well known Norwegian performers.

In 2008, Simone also collaborated on the album Magiske kroker & hemmeligheter with music for children, produced by Linn Skåber and Jacob Young, with the tune "Vinteren er her". Other artists who participated were Alexander Rybak, Maria Haukaas Storeng, Egil Hegerberg, Venke Knutson, Alejandro Fuentes, Julius Winger, Live Maria Roggen, Jørn Christensen, Paal Flaata and Andrea Bræin Hovig.

Personal life 
Simone has a Turkish father and German mother, and grew up in the small village of Bischoffingen in Baden at the French border, together with her mother and grandparents. When she was eight, in 1979, her mother married a Norwegian and they moved to Volda in Norway. Until 2002 she was a German citizen, but since then she has been a Norwegian citizen.

Simone is married to Norwegian pianist, songwriter and producer Simen Eriksrud, a member of the production duo Seeb, and they have two children together.

Discography

Solo albums 
2005: Last Days And Nights (Passasjen Records)

Collaborations 
With D'Sound
1996: Spice of Life (PolyGram)
1998: Beauty Is A Blessing (PolyGram)
2001: Talkin' Talk (Virgin Records)
2001: Live at Rockefeller Music Hall 2001 (Virgin Records)
2003: Doublehearted (Da Works)
2004: Smooth Escapes – The Very Best of D'Sound (Da Works)
2005: My Today  (Da Works)
2009: Starts And Ends (FarGo Music)
2014: Signs (RCA/Sony Music)
2022: 25 (RCA/Sony Music)

With Savoy
1996: Mary Is Coming (Warner Bros. Records)
2007: Savoy Songbook Vol. 1 (Universal Music)

With A-ha
2000: Minor Earth, Major Sky (Warner Bros. Records)

With Bjørn Eidsvåg
2006: Nåde (Petroleum Records)

With Donkeyboy
2009: Caught in a Life (Warner Bros. Records)
2012: Silver Moon (Warner Bros. Records)

With Bjørn Johan Muri
2009: Airwaves (Universal Music)

With Melody Club
2011: Human Harbour (Electric Records)

With Eric Saade
2013: Forgive Me (Roxy Recordings)

With Marion Raven
2013: Songs From  a Blackbird (Blackbird Music / Sony Music Norway)
2014: Scandal, Vol.1 (Blackbird Music / RCA)
2015: Scandal, Vol.2'' (Blackbird Music / RCA)

References

External links 

Simone Larsen at Filmfront.no (Norwegian)
Dagbladet: Larsen spesial – intervju, 2003

 

1970 births
Living people
Norwegian people of German descent
Norwegian people of Turkish descent
Naturalised citizens of Norway
Norwegian musicians
Scandinavian musicians
Norwegian women jazz singers
Norwegian jazz guitarists
Norwegian jazz composers
Spellemannprisen winners
Musicians from Volda
20th-century guitarists
21st-century Norwegian guitarists
20th-century Norwegian women singers
20th-century Norwegian singers
21st-century Norwegian women singers
21st-century Norwegian singers
20th-century women guitarists
21st-century women guitarists